Loggia is an architectural feature. 

Loggia  may also refer to:

 Loggia (surname), Italian surname
 Loggia P2, a Masonic lodge under the Grand Orient of Italy
 Robert Loggia (1930–2015), American actor

See also 

 Logia
 La Loggia (disambiguation)